Pleckstrin homology domain-containing family F member 2 is a protein that in humans is encoded by the PLEKHF2 gene.

References

Further reading